Welby is an English village and civil parish in the South Kesteven district of Lincolnshire. The population of the civil parish was 169 in 82 households at the 2011 census. The neighbouring villages are Aisby, Oasby, and Heydour.

History

According to A Dictionary of British Place Names, Welby means a "farmstead or village by a spring or stream", combining the Old English "wella" for a stream, with Old Scandinavian "by" for a "farmstead, village or settlement".

Welby is recorded in the 1086 Domesday account as "Wellebi", within two manors in the Threo Hundred of Kesteven. In 1066 Queen Edith was Lord of the Manor, this transferred to William I in 1086, who also became tenant in chief. In 1086 the lordship was transferred to Ranulf, with Guy of Craon becoming tenant in chief.

Welby's Grade I listed Anglican parish church is dedicated to St Bartholomew the Apostle. The church originates from the 13th century and is mainly Early English, but with a Perpendicular clerestory and porch. In 1873 the north aisle was extended and the chancel rebuilt by J. H. Hakewill, who matched the Early English style. Within the porch is a 14th-century stone tomb cover with relief depictions of a woman's head and shoulders, within a quatrefoil recess, along with a shrouded baby. It was originally sited in the graveyard.

The former rectory is also a listed building. It was designed by the Grantham architect Cornelius Sherborne.

In 1885 Kelly's Directory reported a Wesleyan chapel, built in 1866, and a school and four almshouses founded in 1780 by William Welby; a further school for 70 pupils had been built in 1869. The 1881 population was 390. The lord of the manor and owner of the parish land was Sir William Earle Welby-Gregory DL, JP, of Denton Hall. Kellys also noted two public houses, the Red Lion and Waggon and Horses, 12 farmers, 4 graziers, a butcher, shoemaker, shopkeeper, carrier, coal dealer, wheelwright, beer retailer, harness maker and a blacksmith.

Community
St Bartholomew's Church belongs to the Loveden Deanery of the Diocese of Lincoln. The incumbent is Rev. Alan Littlewood.

The village road sign includes images of St Bartholomew's Church and of a cricketer; Welby has a village cricket team.

Welby's present-day public house is the Crown and Anchor.

References

External links

Villages in Lincolnshire
Civil parishes in Lincolnshire
South Kesteven District